Burak may refer to:
 Burak (name), given name and those who bear it
 Al-Buraq, Syria, village in Syria
 Burak, Iran (disambiguation), places in Iran
 Borak (cosmetic) or burak, a facial cosmetic paste used by the Sama-Bajau people of Southeast Asia

See also